"Kiss an Angel Good Mornin'" is a song written by Ben Peters, and recorded by American country music artist Charley Pride.  It was released in October 1971 as the first single from the album Charley Pride Sings Heart Songs.  The song has since become one of his signature tunes and was his eighth song to reach number one on the country charts. It was also Pride's only single to reach the Top 40 on the pop charts, peaking at #21 on the Billboard Hot 100, and also went into the Top Ten of the Adult Contemporary charts. It also reached #19 on the U.S. Cash Box Top 100. The song spent four months on the pop chart, longer than any of his other hits.  Billboard ranked it as the No. 74 song for 1972.

Though missing the Top 40 nationally, "Kiss an Angel Good Mornin'" reached the Top 10 in Sydney, Australia on 2NUR, peaking at number seven.

Content 
A man and a woman are happily married, and his friends ask the secret to their love. He says that he gets to "kiss an angel good mornin'", referring to his lover, and to "love her like a devil," referring to himself.

Cover versions
George Jones covered the song on his 1972 album George Jones (We Can Make It).

Conway Twitty recorded his version in 1972 on his album I Can't See Me Without You.

Gene Stuart recorded a version in Ireland in 1972.

Roy Clark recorded a version on his album entitled "Roy Clark Country!" released in 1972.

Percy Sledge covered the song on his 1979 album Sings Country.

Alan Jackson covered the song on his 1999 album Under the Influence.

Heather Myles covered the song on her 1998 album Highways & Honky Tonks.

Chart performance

References

External links
 

Songs about kissing
1971 singles
1971 songs
Charley Pride songs
Roy Clark songs
George Jones songs
Conway Twitty songs
Percy Sledge songs
Alan Jackson songs
Songs written by Ben Peters
Song recordings produced by Jack Clement
RCA Records singles